Shōryū Bradley is a Sōtō Zen priest and the founder and abbot of Gyobutsuji Zen Monastery located near Kingston, Arkansas.

Biography
Shoryu Bradley studied psychology at Texas A&M University, where he received a B.S. He went on to graduate studies at the University of Texas and earned an M.Ed. in rehabilitation counseling. In 2002, Shoryu was ordained at Austin Zen Center by his teacher Seirin Barbara Kohn, where he practiced until 2004. In 2004, Shoryu went to study with Shōhaku Okumura at the Sanshin Zen Community in Bloomington, Indiana. He also visited and trained at Tassajara Zen Mountain Center near Monterey, California. He attended two Sōtōshū International Training angos, one at Shogo-ji in Kumamoto Prefecture, Japan. In 2010 Shoryu received dharma transmission from Okumura.

In 2011 Shoryu Bradley founded Gyobutsuji Zen Monastery in order to create a place for the practice of zazen in the United States similar to Antai-ji.

Bibliography

References
 Sweeping Zen
 Soto Zen Buddhist Association

External links
 Gyobutsuji Zen Monastery

Zen Buddhism writers
Buddhist translators
Soto Zen Buddhists
Zen Buddhist priests
Living people
Japanese Zen Buddhists
Year of birth missing (living people)